Alonso de Pastrana (?  – ?) was a cacique who served as lieutenant governor of Spanish Florida for two one-year terms. The first commenced on November8, 1622, under Juan de Salinas, and the second on August17, 1627, under Luis de Rojas y Borja. In 1657, Pastrana was cacique in Arapaja and Santa Fe.

References

Royal Governors of La Florida